Beatty Park Leisure Centre is a swimming pool complex in the suburb of North Perth, Western Australia.  Originally known as the Beatty Park Aquatic Centre, it was built for the 1962 British Empire and Commonwealth Games as the major swimming event venue, along with the Perry Lakes Stadium athletics complex. Prior to the construction of the centre, the area was part of a large reserve known as Beatty Park.

The centre was refurbished in 1994 to include creche, spa and gymnasium facilities as well as several indoor pools.  It has spectator seating for approximately 5,000 people and is administered by the City of Vincent.

Another major redevelopment took place from 2011 to 2013, costing $17 million. This redevelopment included the installation of a geothermal bore for heating the upgraded pools and expanding the health and fitness facilities to include a  gym, two Group Fitness studios and a new entry.

1962 Games
Commonwealth records were set at Beatty Park in the following events:

References

Heritage Council of Western Australia - Heritage Register entry

External links

Beatty Park website

Swimming venues in Australia
State Register of Heritage Places in the City of Vincent
Vincent Street, North Perth
1962 British Empire and Commonwealth Games venues
Commonwealth Games swimming venues